A Gemarkung (also Markung, in Switzerland also Gemarchen, in Austria Katastralgemeinde) is the entirety of all land plots of a specific municipality recorded in the cadastre in the countries of Germany, Austria and Switzerland. Gemarkung registers record the parcels' location, usage and geomorphology and the like qualities, however, the rights to the land (as property, or collateral liened by a mortgage) are kept in the Grundbuch (land register). A Gemarkung is made up of a number of, usually contiguous, plots of urban (Grundstücke) or rural land (Flurstücke). Between the levels of Flurstück and Gemarkung is often found the level of Flur, usually a tract of open land or forest.

External links 
 „Gemarkungs- und Gemeindeverzeichnis“: Bayerisches Gemarkungsverzeichnis (ZIP-Archiv mit Textdatei)
 Gemarkungsgrenzen Bayern (hier Vermessungsamt 93 = Wolfratshausen)
 Gemarkungsverzeichnis Brandenburg (PDF-Datei; 571 kB)
 Gemarkungsverzeichnis Rheinland-Pfalz (ZIP-Archiv mit Excel-Tabelle; 215 kB)
 Gemarkung - Definitionen

References 

 
Land use